HMS Fortune was an , and the twenty-first ship of the Royal Navy to bear the name. She was launched in 1913 and was sunk at the Battle of Jutland in 1916.

Design and description
Previous  weapons had been of the breech-loading (BL) type. The guns were shipped one each on the forecastle and either side abreast the after torpedo tube (or amidships before and after the tube in some ships.) All ships had three funnels, the foremost being tall and narrow, the second short and wide and the third level with the second but narrower. The foremost torpedo tube was sited between the second and third funnels, a distinctive feature of this class.

While Ardent novel construction seems to have been a success, no more destroyers were built for the Royal Navy using longitudinal framing until the J-class destroyers in the 1930s.

The destroyer had a complement of 73.

Fortune was given an experimental clipper bow

Fortune was armed with three QF  L/40 Mark IV guns on P Mk. IX mountings. However, Fortune was a "Builders' Special", and the second 4-inch gun was mounted on a platform between the no.2 and 3 funnels. The ship one QF 2 pdr pom-pom Mk. II gun. The destroyer was also equipped with two single torpedo tubes for four 21 inch (533 mm) torpedoes.

Construction and career
Fortune was laid down under the 1911–1912 construction programme by Fairfield Shipbuilding and Engineering Company and launched on 17 March 1913. She was temporarily renamed HMS Kismet in October 1913, but this was reverted shortly afterwards.

She joined the 4th Destroyer Flotilla on completion and served with the Grand Fleet on the outbreak of World War I.

Battle of Jutland and loss
During the evening of 31 May 1916, the 4th Flotilla was screening the rear of the Grand Fleet in the Battle of Jutland, against the Imperial German Navy's High Seas Fleet. At 11:20 pm, the 4th Flotilla encountered unknown ships off their starboard quarter. Believing them to be British, the flotilla leader  flashed a challenge. Most aimed for Tipperary which was soon ablaze. The destroyers began to return fire and launched a torpedo attack, which led to a collision among the Germans.

They began to look for the German ships which had disengaged after battering their way through the 4th Flotilla. About 11:30 pm they eventually found four large ships and engaged them. Both Ardent and Fortune were sunk in the ensuing firefight. The last anyone saw of Fortune was the ship afire but still firing as the destroyer was sinking. There were seven survivors, the other 67 crewmen were killed or missing.

The wrecksite is designated as a protected place, under the Protection of Military Remains Act 1986.

Pennant numbers

References

Citations

Bibliography
 Brown, David K. (2010) The Grand Fleet: Warship Design and Development 1906–1922. Barnsley, UK: Seaforth Publishing. .
 Friedman, Norman. (2009) British Destroyers: From Earliest Days to the Second World War, Barnsley, UK: Seaforth Publishing. .
 Gardiner, Robert & Gray, Randal, eds. (1985). Conway's All the World's Fighting Ships 1906–1921. Annapolis, Maryland: Naval Institute Press. .
 Massie, Robert K. (2003). Castles of Steel: Britain, Germany, and the Winning of the Great War at Sea. New York: Ballantine Books.

External links 

 Battle of Jutland Crew Lists Project - HMS Fortune Crew List

 

Acasta-class destroyers
World War I destroyers of the United Kingdom
Maritime incidents in 1916
Ships sunk at the Battle of Jutland
Protected Wrecks of the United Kingdom
1913 ships